Wellington Cabral Costa (born 1 February 1996), commonly known as Foguete ou Taco de Piquete is a Brazilian footballer.

Career statistics

Club

Honours

Club
Ventforet Kofu
 Emperor's Cup: 2022

References

External links

1996 births
Living people
Brazilian footballers
Brazilian expatriate footballers
Association football defenders
Campeonato Brasileiro Série B players
CR Vasco da Gama players
São Paulo FC players
Vila Nova Futebol Clube players
Esporte Clube Santo André players
FC Cascavel players
Kagoshima United FC players
Ventforet Kofu players
J2 League players
J3 League players
Brazilian expatriate sportspeople in Japan
Expatriate footballers in Japan
Sportspeople from Rio de Janeiro (state)
People from Itaboraí